Waterloo is a town in Laurens County, South Carolina, United States. The population was 166 at the 2010 census.

History
Waterloo was incorporated as a town in 1885.

Rosemont Plantation was added to the National Register of Historic Places in 1993.

Geography
Waterloo is located at  (34.352968, -82.058068).

According to the United States Census Bureau, the town has a total area of 1.4 square miles (3.7 km2), all land.

Demographics

As of the census of 2000, there were 203 people, 75 households, and 57 families residing in the town. The population density was 144.2 people per square mile (55.6/km2). There were 85 housing units at an average density of 60.4 per square mile (23.3/km2). The racial makeup of the town was 43.35% White, 56.16% African American and 0.49% Native American. Hispanic or Latino of any race were 1.48% of the population.

There were 75 households, out of which 37.3% had children under the age of 18 living with them, 45.3% were married couples living together, 17.3% had a female householder with no husband present, and 22.7% were non-families. 20.0% of all households were made up of individuals, and 9.3% had someone living alone who was 65 years of age or older. The average household size was 2.71 and the average family size was 3.05.

In the town, the population was spread out, with 28.1% under the age of 18, 10.8% from 18 to 24, 27.1% from 25 to 44, 21.7% from 45 to 64, and 12.3% who were 65 years of age or older. The median age was 33 years. For every 100 females, there were 111.5 males. For every 100 females age 18 and over, there were 102.8 males.

The median income for a household in the town was $27,917, and the median income for a family was $36,875. Males had a median income of $24,063 versus $18,750 for females. The per capita income for the town was $14,159. About 5.7% of families and 12.3% of the population were below the poverty line, including 6.4% of those under the age of eighteen and 21.4% of those 65 or over.

References

External links
 ACCESS 15; Laurens County Public, educational, and government access (PEG) cable TV channel
Information about Waterloo from Laurens County

Towns in Laurens County, South Carolina
Towns in South Carolina